Nuclear power in Germany accounted for 13.3% of German electricity supply in 2021, generated by six power plants, of which three were switched off at the end of 2021, the other three due to cease operation at the end of 2022 according to the complete nuclear phase-out plan of 2011.  However, in early 2022 this plan was called into question once more in light of the 2022 Russian invasion of Ukraine which threatens Germany's supply of natural gas. There have been calls to either delay the shutdown of the remaining three reactors or to restart operation in those reactors that were shut down in late 2021.

German nuclear power began with research reactors in the 1950s and 1960s with the first commercial plant coming online in 1969. Nuclear power has been a topical political issue in recent decades, with continuing debates about when the technology should be phased out. The anti-nuclear movement in Germany has a long history dating back to the early 1970s, when large demonstrations prevented the construction of a nuclear plant at Wyhl. This greatly intensified when the Chernobyl disaster happened in 1986 and radionuclides released by the accident could be detected in much of Germany. The topic received renewed attention and policy reversals when the anti-nuclear Green party was part of the federal government from 1998 to 2005, at the start of 2007 due to the political impact of the Russia-Belarus energy dispute, in 2010 when the economy-friendly FDP was part of Merkel's coalition, and in 2011 after the Fukushima nuclear accident in Japan. Within days of the March 2011 Fukushima Daiichi nuclear disaster, large anti-nuclear protests occurred in Germany. Protests continued and, on 29 May 2011, Merkel's government announced that it would close all of its nuclear power plants by 2022. Political writer  David Frum characterized Merkel's decision as a political move to improve her approval ratings which had sagged after the post 2008 financial crisis bailout of southern Europe by Germany.

Eight of the seventeen operating reactors in Germany, mostly older ones, were permanently shut down following Fukushima. Chancellor Angela Merkel said the nuclear power phase-out, previously scheduled to be completed as late as 2036, would give Germany a competitive advantage in the renewable energy era, stating, "As the first big industrialized nation, we can achieve such a transformation toward efficient and renewable energies, with all the opportunities that brings for exports, developing new technologies and jobs". Merkel also pointed to Japan's "helplessness"—despite being an industrialized, technologically advanced nation—in the face of its nuclear disaster. The nuclear electricity production was primarily replaced with coal electricity production and electricity importing. One study found that the nuclear phase-out caused €3 to €8 billion in social costs per year, primarily due to increases in mortality due to exposure to pollution from fossil fuels.

German engineering-industry giant Siemens announced a complete withdrawal from the nuclear industry in 2011, as a response to the Fukushima nuclear disaster. Remaining nuclear operating companies in Germany are E.ON, RWE, and EnBW. Germany remains active in basic and applied research in many nuclear fields, including the Forschungsreaktor München II, which does not have a firm shutdown date set. Germany also contributes its significant expertise in particle accelerators to MYRRHA a research project into a subcritical reactor used for the nuclear transmutation of high level waste.

History

Prior to the takeover of Nazi Germany, German universities were the employers of some of the world's most renowned nuclear physicists, including Albert Einstein, Otto Hahn, Lise Meitner, Leo Szilard and others. In 1938 Hahn and his colleague Fritz Straßmann conducted an experiment designed by Lise Meitner (who had already been driven into exile due to her Jewish ancestry) which led to the discovery of nuclear fission. Soon thereafter a "race" began between the soon to be belligerents of World War II to find - military or civilian - applications of the new technology. Hampered by infighting, lack of resources, mistakes and the suspicion of Nazi authorities against "Jewish physics", the Uranverein ("uranium club") led by Werner Heisenberg never got close to building a Uranmaschine ("uranium machine" - what the Americans called a "pile") that achieved criticality, let alone building a nuclear weapon. When the Americans took over the last German attempt at a research reactor during the war at Haigerloch in southwestern Germany, it was clear to the people involved in the Alsos Mission that Germany had fallen behind the Manhattan project by a considerable amount.

German publications of the 1950s and 1960s contained criticism of some features of nuclear power including its safety. Nuclear waste disposal was widely recognized as a major problem, with concern publicly expressed as early as 1954. In 1964, one author went so far as to state "that the dangers and costs of the necessary final disposal of nuclear waste could possibly make it necessary to forego the development of nuclear energy".

As in many industrialised countries, nuclear power in Germany was first developed in the late 1950s. Only a few experimental reactors went online before 1960, and an experimental nuclear power station in Kahl am Main opened in 1960. All of the German nuclear power plants that opened between 1960 and 1970 had – like otherways in the whole world – a power output of less than 1,000 MW and have now all closed down. The first almost fully commercial nuclear power plant started operating in 1969: Obrigheim operated until 2005, where it was shutdown by phaseout decision of the government. The first station with a power output of more than 1000 MW each were the two units of Biblis Nuclear Power Plant in 1974 and 1976.

A closed nuclear fuel cycle was planned, starting with mining operations in the Saarland and the Schwarzwald; uranium ore concentration, fuel rod filling production in Hanau; and reprocessing of the spent fuel in the never-built nuclear fuel reprocessing plant at Wackersdorf. The radioactive waste was intended to be stored in a deep geological repository, as part of the Gorleben long-term storage project. Today, there is a "ergebnisoffener" searching process over the whole country for the storage of the irradiated nuclear fuel.

In the early 1960s there was a proposal to build a nuclear power station in West Berlin, but the project was dropped in 1962. Another attempt to site a reactor in a major city was made in 1967, when BASF planned to build a nuclear power station on its ground at Ludwigshafen, to supply process steam. The project was withdrawn by BASF.

In 1959, 15 municipal electric companies established the Association of Experimental Reactor GmbH (Arbeitsgemeinschaft Versuchsreaktor, AVR) to demonstrate the feasibility and viability of a gas-cooled, graphite-moderated high temperature reactor (HTGR).
In the early 1960s, it started the design and construction of AVR at the Jülich Research Centre. First criticality was attained in 1966, and the AVR was in operation for more than 22 years. Despite the fuel feed and discharge system showed excellent availability, the AVR was shut down for political reasons in 1988. The AVR was designed to breed uranium-233 from thorium-232. Thorium-232 is over 100 times as abundant in the Earth's crust as uranium-235.

In 1965, before the AVR started operation, a basic design for a commercial demonstration HTGR reactor using thorium was started, the THTR-300. The HTGR, rated at 300 MWe, synchronized with the grid in 1985. Six months later a fuel pebble became lodged in the reactor core. After repairs, it was restarted and operated from July 1986, reaching full power in September 1986. It operated until September 1988, and was shutdown in September 1989.

In the early 1970s, large public demonstrations prevented the construction of a nuclear plant at Wyhl. The Wyhl protests were an example of a local community challenging the nuclear industry through a strategy of direct action and civil disobedience. Police were accused of using unnecessarily violent means. Anti-nuclear success at Wyhl inspired nuclear opposition throughout Germany and elsewhere.

The Rheinsberg Nuclear Power Plant was the first (mostly experimental) nuclear power plant in East Germany. It was of low power and operated from 1966 until 1990. The second to be commissioned, the Greifswald Nuclear Power Plant, was planned to house eight of the Russian 440 MW VVER-440 reactors. The first four went online between 1973 and 1979. Greifswald 5 operated for less than a month before it was closed, the other three were cancelled during different stages of their build-up. In 1990, during the German reunification, all eastern Germany nuclear power plants were closed due to flaws in safety standards. The Stendal Nuclear Power Plant in East Germany was to be the largest nuclear power station in Germany. After German reunification, and due to concerns about the Soviet design, construction was stopped and the power station was never completed. In the 1990s the three cooling towers which had been erected were demolished, and the area is an industrial estate today.

By 1992, a group of German and Swiss firms planned to proceed with construction of a HTR-500, a design that made considerable use of the THTR-300 technology. But the by then politically hostile environment in the light of the Chernobyl disaster as well as technical issues with the THTR-300 halted any effort. The technology is now pursued by the Chinese as the HTR-PM.

Construction companies 

In September 2011, Siemens, which had been responsible for constructing all 17 of Germany's existing nuclear power plants, announced that it would exit the nuclear sector following the Fukushima disaster and the subsequent changes to German energy policy. It will no longer build nuclear power plants anywhere in the world. The company's chairman, Peter Löscher, said that "Siemens was ending plans to cooperate with Rosatom, the Russian state-controlled nuclear power company, in the construction of dozens of nuclear plants throughout Russia over the coming two decades". Peter Löscher has supported the German government's planned energy transition to renewable energy technologies, calling it a "project of the century" and saying Berlin's target of reaching 35% renewable energy sources by 2020 was feasible.

An October 2016 story in the Süddeutsche Zeitung reported that Finnish operator TVO is calling on Siemens to take financial responsibility for the completion of Unit3 of the Olkiluoto Nuclear Power Plant in Finland, because its project partner, the French-German  Areva Group, is being broken up by the French government.  Unit3, an EPR, has a history of delays and its future profitability is in doubt.

Accidents

Closures and phase-out 

During the chancellorship of Gerhard Schröder, the social democratic-green government had decreed Germany's final retreat from using nuclear power by 2022, but the phase-out plan was initially delayed in late 2010, when during chancellorship of center-right Angela Merkel the coalition conservative-liberal government decreed a 12-year delay of the schedule. This delay provoked protests, including a human chain of 50,000 from Stuttgart to the nearby nuclear plant in Neckarwestheim. Anti-nuclear demonstrations on 12 March attracted 100,000 across Germany.

On 14 March 2011, in response to the renewed concern about the use of nuclear energy the Fukushima incident raised in the German public and in light of upcoming elections in three German states, Merkel declared a 3-month moratorium on the reactor lifespan extension passed in 2010. On 15 March, the German government announced that it would temporarily shut down 8 of its 17 reactors, i.e. all reactors that went online before 1981. Former proponents of nuclear energy such as Angela Merkel, Guido Westerwelle, and Stefan Mappus changed their positions, yet 71% of the population believed that to be a tactical manoeuvre related to upcoming state elections. In the largest anti-nuclear demonstration ever held in Germany, some 250,000 people protested on 26 March under the slogan "heed Fukushima – shut off all nuclear plants".

On 30 May 2011, the German government announced a plan to shut all nuclear reactors by 2022. Environment Minister Norbert Röttgen stated of the decision, "It's definite. The latest end for the last three nuclear power plants is 2022. There will be no clause for revision". Prior to the decision, Germany's renewable energy sector already provided 17% of Germany's electricity and employed about 370,000. The decision to phase-out nuclear power has been called the swiftest change of political course since unification. Only a year earlier Angela Merkel's government overturned a decade-old decision to close all nuclear plants by 2022.

Physicist Amory Lovins has said: "Chancellor Merkel was so shocked by Fukushima that she turned Germany’s energy focus from nuclear (of which she closed 41% and will close the rest within a decade) to efficiency and renewables. That’s supported by three-fourths of Germans and opposed by no political party".

Merkel stated that Germany "[does not] only want to renounce nuclear energy by 2022, we also want to reduce our CO2 emissions by 40 percent and double our share of renewable energies, from about 17 percent today to then 35 percent". The chancellor noted the "helplessness" of Japan to manage the Fukushima Daiichi nuclear disaster. Merkel asserted that Germany's energy policy would be safe, reliable, and independent from imports, with affordable prices for both consumers and industry. Increased investment in natural gas plants would provide a backup to ensure consistency for those times when the solar, wind and hydroelectric sources did not meet demand.

At the time of the Japanese Fukushima disaster, Germany was getting just under a quarter of its electricity from nuclear power. After the Fukushima disaster, the following eight German nuclear power reactors were declared permanently shut down on 6 August 2011: BiblisA andB, Brunsbuettel, Isar1, Kruemmel, Neckarwestheim1, Philippsburg1 and Unterweser.

Some German manufacturers and energy companies have criticized the phase-out plans, warning that Germany could face blackouts. While this did not happen there has been an increase in voltage fluctuations which has damaged industrial facilities and caused them to install voltage regulators. A 2020 study by the Haas School of Business found that the lost nuclear electricity production has been replaced primarily by coal-fired production and net electricity imports. The social cost of this shift from nuclear to coal is approximately twelve billion US dollars per year, mostly from the eleven hundred additional deaths associated with exposure to the local air pollution emitted when burning fossil fuels. Swedish energy company Vattenfall went in front of the World Bank's International Centre for Settlement of Investment Disputes (ICSID) to seek compensation from the German government for the premature shut-down of its nuclear plants.

On 5 December 2016, the Federal Constitutional Court ruled that the nuclear plant operators affected by the accelerated phase-out of nuclear power following the Fukushima disaster are eligible for "adequate" compensation.  The court found that the nuclear exit was essentially constitutional but that the utilities are entitled to damages for the "good faith" investments they made in 2010.  The utilities can now sue the German government under civil law.  E.ON, RWE, and Vattenfall are expected to seek a total of €19billion under separate suits.  
Six cases were registered with courts in Germany, .

As of March 2019, only seven nuclear plants had been left in operation and should be scheduled to be shut down and dismantled. As of early 2022, three plants remain for the final year.

Renewed debate in light of the war in Ukraine
After Russia invaded Ukraine in 2022, German energy policy – which had up to that point relied on Russian imports (particularly natural gas) to a large degree – was re-evaluated, including a temporary suspension of the controversial Nord Stream 2 pipeline. 
The German minister of economy and climate, Robert Habeck answered in an interview that he would be "open" to extending the life of the remaining three nuclear power plants, but expressed skepticism as to the feasibility of and sense in such a move. Several newspapers called for a re-opening of the debate on the nuclear phaseout, including the Frankfurter Allgemeine Zeitung. The (former) operators of Germany's remaining three nuclear power plants as well as the three reactors that had been shut down in late 2021 (but not yet dismantled) commented that they are "open" to negotiations with the government as to extending the lifetime of those reactors or restarting those that were already shut down. On 21 August 2022, German Economy Minister Robert Habeck said that Germany would not reverse the phase-out itself, but said that he was open to the idea of extending the lifespan of the Isar Nuclear Power Plant in Bavaria, subject to a stress test of Germany's electricity system.

On 5 September 2022, the Federal Government announced that two of the three remaining nuclear power plants (Neckarwestheim and Isar 2) would operate beyond 31 December 2022 until April 2023 (cycle stretch out), while the Emsland Nuclear Power Plant was to be shut down as planned. However, on 10 October 2022, Scholz announced that all three would remain operating until April 2023.

Radioactive waste management 
Nuclear power plants take years to be dismantled and contaminated sites have to be cleared and declared free of radiation. One estimate puts the cost of dismantling Germany's nuclear reactor sites at €18 billion, not counting the cost of radioactive waste disposal.

No country has permanent storage sites for nuclear energy waste and spent nuclear fuel is stockpiled in temporary locations. In Germany, heavily contaminated spent fuel rods are stored in Castor containers on several temporary sites around the country.

Germany is preparing the former iron-ore mine Schacht Konrad in Salzgitter as a national facility for the permanent disposal of low- to medium-grade radioactive waste materials.

Nuclear waste liability buyout 2016 

On 19 October 2016, the German cabinet finalized a deal with nuclear power plant operators E.ON, EnBW, RWE, and Vattenfall over long-term nuclear waste disposal.  Under the agreement, the four operators are freed of responsibility for storing radioactive waste – that responsibility is instead transferred  to the state.  In return, the operators will pay a total of €17.4billion into a state-administered fund to finance the interim and final storage of nuclear waste.  They will also pay an additional "risk surcharge" of €6.2billion (35.5%) to cover the eventuality that costs exceed current projections and that the interest accrued by the fund is lower than expected.  The operators will be responsible for decommissioning and deconstructing their own nuclear power plants, as well as preparing their radioactive waste for final storage.

Critics, including the German Renewable Energy Federation and BUND, claim the total of €23.6billion would prove insufficient and that future taxpayers will carry the risk.

The draft law is available in German. 
It is due to be enacted in early 2017.

Transmutation
While the official policy of Germany is to dispose of spent fuel in a deep geological repository inside Germany's borders, Germany is also involved in research into nuclear transmutation of high level waste (primarily Actinides, which account for most of the long-term radiotoxicity of spent nuclear fuel). An important research project underway in Belgium is MYRRHA which relies on German suppliers for the particle accelerator which is in a sense the "heart" of every Accelerator Driven System and whose reliability is the key issue to be solved before such systems can be commercialized.

Replacement by renewables, gas, and coal

Since nuclear power generated almost a third of the electricity in Germany, many thought that the country would  have to import energy as the nuclear phase-out progressed. At first, Germany was still selling more electricity than it bought, due to its renewable energy industry. Renewable energy supplied a record 20.8% of Germany's  electricity in the first half of 2011, from wind power, solar power, biomass and hydro. Germany installed over 7,400 MW of solar in 2010 and another 7,000 MW was added in 2011. Solar and wind capacity is expected to grow by 32% from 2012 to 2013. Since 2011 the price of electricity has risen by 20% and as of 2018 the cost of electricity in Germany is the 10th most expensive compared to other countries in the world.

Germany has combined the phase-out with an initiative for renewable energy and wants to increase the efficiency of fossil power plants in an effort to reduce the reliance on coal. According to the former German Minister for the Environment Jürgen Trittin, in 2020, this would cut carbon dioxide emissions by 40 percent compared with 1990 levels. Germany has become one of the leaders in the efforts to fulfill the Kyoto protocol. Critics of the German policy have called it a mistake to abandon nuclear power, claiming the only alternative to nuclear power was coal and abandoning nuclear power was therefore contradictory to the goal of lowering CO2 emissions.

As a result of its efforts and subsidies, Germany has developed advanced non-conventional renewable energy for electricity generation, particularly in photovoltaic and wind turbine installations. At the same time, Germany continues to rely heavily on coal power, with usage increasing to offset the phase-out of nuclear energy.

The German nuclear industry has insisted that its shutdown would cause major damage to the country's industrial base. In 2012, member firms of the Verband der Industriellen Energie- und Kraftwirtschaft (VIK) reported power failures of several seconds duration, combined with a rise in frequency fluctuations. These were reportedly caused by network overloads due to the shutdown of nuclear power plants, and an increase in wind power generation. VIK also fear that industrial control units will be damaged by outages.

The cost of replacing Germany's nuclear power generation with renewable energy has been officially estimated by the German Ministry of Economics at about €0.01/kWh (about €55 billion for the next decade), on top of the €13 billion per year already devoted to subsidizing renewables. 
However, unofficial estimates of the ministry, and of the Rhenish-Westphalian Institute for Economic Research (RWI), German Energy Agency (DENA), Federation of German Consumer Organizations (VZBV), and the government-owned development bank (KfW), put the cost several times higher, at about €250 billion ($340 B) over the next decade.

In March 2013, the administrative court for the German state of Hesse ruled that a three-month closure imposed by the government on RWE's Biblis A and B reactors as an immediate response to Fukushima Daiichi accident was illegal. The state ministry of the environment acted illegally in March 2011, when an order was issued for the immediate closure of the Biblis units. RWE complied with the decree by shutting Biblis-A immediately, however as the plants were in compliance with the relevant safety requirements, the German government had no legal grounds for shutting them. The court ruled that the closure notice was illegal because RWE had not been given sufficient opportunity to respond to the order.

In July 2022, faced with an energy crisis, the German parliament voted to reactivate closed coal power plants, at least temporarily.

Current operators 

 the nuclear power plant operators in Germany comprise:

 PreussenElektra GmbH
 EnBW Energie Baden-Wuerttemberg AG
 RWE Power AG

Reactors

See also

Energy policy of the European Union
Energy in Germany
Energy transition
Energy transition in Germany
List of power stations in Germany
Nuclear energy policy
Nuclear power by country

References

External links
German Reactor Safety Authority (GRS)
"Germany split over green energy", BBC
"Germany says auf Wiedersehen to nuclear power, guten Tag to renewables", Grist magazine, 12 August 2005
The German federal ministry of environment, nature conservation and reactor safety about the phase-out